Ek Chuaj, also known as Ek Chuah, Ekchuah, God M according to the Schellhas-Zimmermann-Taube classification of codical gods, is a Postclassic Maya merchant deity as well as a patron of cacao. Ek Chuaj is part of a pantheon of Maya deities that have been depicted in hieroglyphs and artwork of various Maya sites and has been interpreted as a significant part of Maya religion.

Description
Ek Chuaj can either be depicted as black-and-white striped, as he is in the Dresden Codex, or entirely black, as he is in the Madrid Codex. Other distinguishing characteristics of Ek Chuaj are his mouth, which is encircled by a red-brown border, his large lower lip, and the presence of two curved lines to the right of his eye. Other depictions of Ek Chuaj show him as an old man with only a single tooth. This is the appearance he most regularly takes in the Madrid Codex. He has been depicted with a pack of goods commonly carried by merchants, and his carrying of a burden is also indicated by the rope or tumpline tied around his head. He may also carry a spear and, in some instances, a scorpion's tail.

Significance

Mentioned in: The history of Chocolate 

Ek Chuaj holds various meanings depending upon the contexts in which he is depicted. His principal associations are with trade and cacao use.

As a Merchant Deity
Ek Chuaj is often depicted carrying a pack and a spear, indicating transportation of goods as well as the dangerous life of a merchant. In this context, Ek Chuaj is a patron deity of travelers and journeys. During journeys, travelers would stack three stones on top of each other and offer incense to Ek Chuaj at night to ensure a safe journey home. It is possible that Ek Chuaj and the "Guide of the Merchant," otherwise known as Polaris or the North Star, are related both symbolically and linguistically. "Ek" can be translated as either "black" or "star".

As a Patron of Cacao
Cacao was one of the most important products traded by Maya merchants and it was often treated as currency. Because Ek Chuaj is a patron of cacao, owners of cacao groves would hold ceremonies or special festivals in his honor. One of these was held during Muwan, a "month" in the Maya solar calendar or haab'. The presence of this ceremony suggests that Ek Chuaj was an agriculturally symbolic deity within Maya society.

Interactions with other deities
Ek Chuaj is sometimes depicted in combat, most often with Buluk Chabtan (God F) the god of war, violence, and sacrifice. This interaction has been interpreted as representing the need for traveling merchants to have the ability to ward off hostile attacks. In the Madrid Codex, Ek Chuaj and God L are closely related and sometimes nearly indistinguishable from one another. It appears that God L was a Classic Maya counterpart of Ek Chuaj. As Ek Chuaj gained influence and importance, he supplanted God L. In some cases, Ek Chuaj seems have attributes of other deities. For example, in one instance he is depicted with the head of an old man, the spine of a death god, and the tail of a scorpion.

Aliases
 Ek Chuaj
 Ek Chuah
 Ekchuah
 God M
 Black Scorpion (In Postclassic codices)

References

External links 
 Representation of Deities of the Maya Manuscripts, by Paul Schellhas, 1904, from Project Gutenberg
 Accession Iconography of Chan-Bahlum in the Group of the Cross at Palenque, by Linda Schele, 1976, from Mesoweb

Maya gods
Maya mythology and religion
Commerce gods